Chesterville is a town in eThekwini in the KwaZulu-Natal province of South Africa.

Village between Cato Manor and Westville, some 13 km west of Durban. Named after T J Chester, a former manager of the Native Administration Department of Durban.

The writer Nat Nakasa was reburied in his Chesterville, his childhood home, after his body was returned from the United States, where he died in exile.

References

WhatsApp

Populated places in eThekwini Metropolitan Municipality